Hamoud Al-Saadi (born 26 January 1992) is an Omani footballer who plays for Dhofar S.C.S.C. in Oman Professional League.

Club career

On 25 September 2012, he signed a contract with Dhofar S.C.S.C.  On 7 July 2014, he agreed a one-year contract extension with Dhofar S.C.S.C.

Club career statistics

International career
Hamoud is part of the first team squad of the Oman national football team. He was selected for the national team for the first time in 2014. He made his first appearance for Oman on 11 October 2011 against Australia in a 2014 FIFA World Cup qualification match. He has made appearances in the 2014 WAFF Championship and has represented the national team in the 2014 FIFA World Cup qualification.

National team career statistics

Goals for Senior National Team
Scores and results list Oman's goal tally first.

Honours

Club
With Al-Suwaiq
Omani League (1): 2010–11
Oman Super Cup (0): Runner-up 2010, 2011

With Dhofar
Oman Professional League Cup (1): 2012; Runner-up 2014–15
Oman Super Cup (0): Runner-up 2012
Baniyas SC International Tournament (1): Winner 2014

References

External links

Hamoud Al-Saadi - FootballDatabase.eu
Hamoud Al-Saadi - GOALZZ.com
Hamoud Al-Saadi - KOOORA.com

1992 births
Living people
People from Muscat, Oman
Omani footballers
Oman international footballers
Association football forwards
Bowsher Club players
Suwaiq Club players
Dhofar Club players
Oman Professional League players
Oman youth international footballers